Lalatendu Bidyadhar Mohapatra was a politician from Odisha, India. He was elected to the Odisha Legislative Assembly from Brahmagiri (Odisha Vidhan Sabha constituency) in the years 1995, 2000 and 2004.

He completed his graduation in history and political science from BJB College. He held the position of vice-president of Orissa Pradesh Congress Committee (OPCC) from 2004 to 2009.

Lalatendu Bidyadhar Mohapatra died on 6 November 2016 due to brain stroke and multiple organ failure.

References 

1964 births
2016 deaths
Members of the Odisha Legislative Assembly
Indian National Congress politicians
Indian National Congress politicians from Odisha